Guillermo Iberio Ortiz Mayagoitia (born 10 February 1941) is a Mexican jurist and former Supreme Court Justice. He previously served as the President (Chief Justice) of the Supreme Court of Justice of the Nation from 2 January 2007 to 31 December 2010.

Ortiz Mayagoitia, a native of Misantla, Veracruz, earned his law degree at the Universidad Veracruzana in Xalapa. He served the judiciary in various positions in  Poza Rica and Tuxpan in his home state and as a clerk at the federal Supreme Court. He later held District Judge positions in the state of Oaxaca and the Federal District, and served as a Circuit Judge in  Villahermosa, Tabasco, and Veracruz, Veracruz. In 1993 he was appointed to the appeals chamber of the Federal Electoral Tribunal.

On 27 January 1995 his Supreme Court appointment, proposed by President Ernesto Zedillo, was ratified by the Senate. He was elected Chief Justice, with seven votes out of eleven, by the Supreme Court on 2 January 2007.

References

External links
Ministro Presidente Guillermo I. Ortiz Mayagoitia Supreme Court of Justice of the Nation
Profile: Guillermo Iberio Ortiz Mayagoitia El Universal, 2 January 2007

1941 births
Living people
Mexican people of Basque descent
20th-century Mexican lawyers
Supreme Court of Justice of the Nation justices
People from Veracruz
Presidents of the Supreme Court of Justice of the Nation
People from Misantla
Universidad Veracruzana alumni
21st-century Mexican lawyers